The 2023 season is the 45th season in the existence of Kuala Lumpur City's and the club's 3rd consecutive season in the top flight of Malaysian football. In addition to the domestic league, the club also participating in this season's edition of Malaysia FA Cup and the Malaysia Cup.

Management team

Squad information

First-team squad

S

I

S

A
I
S

I
U23

I

U23

U23
U20

Remarks:
S These players are registered as ASEAN foreign players.
I These players are registered as International foreign players.
A These players are registered as Asia foreign players.
U23 These players are registered as Under-23 players.
U20 These players are registered as Under-20 players.

Out on loan

Transfers
In:

Out:

Pre-season and friendlies

Competitions

Malaysia Super League

Matches
The league fixtures were announced on 25 January 2023.

Malaysia FA Cup

Statistics

Appearances and goals

|-
! colspan=14 style=background:#dcdcdc; text-align:center| Goalkeepers

|-
! colspan=14 style=background:#dcdcdc; text-align:center| Defenders

|-
! colspan=14 style=background:#dcdcdc; text-align:center| Midfielders

|-
! colspan=14 style=background:#dcdcdc; text-align:center| Forwards

|-
! colspan=14 style=background:#dcdcdc; text-align:center| Players transferred out during the season
|-

Under-23s

Current squad

These Under-23 players or Kuala Lumpur City Extension participated in Malaysian Football League cup.

Coaching staff
 Head coach: Wan Rohaimi Wan Ismail
 Assistant head coach: Mohd Aslam Haja Najmudeen
 Assistant coach: Fadhil Hashim
 Goalkeeper coach: Zuraimi Hasan

MFL Cup

Appearances and goals

References

External links
 Official website

Kuala Lumpur City F.C.
2023
Kuala Lumpur City